Familial dysalbuminemic hyperthyroxinemia is a type of hyperthyroxinemia associated with mutations in the human serum albumin gene. The term was introduced in 1982.

References

External links 

Thyroid disease
Albumin disorders